DeGoes Cliff is a steep rock cliff on the west side of the Morozumi Range. The geographical feature was first mapped by the United States Geological Survey from surveys and U.S. Navy air photos, 1960–63, and was named by the Advisory Committee on Antarctic Names for Louis DeGoes of the National Academy of Sciences, who was Executive Secretary of the Committee on Polar Research, United States National Research Council. The cliff lies situated on the Pennell Coast, a portion of Antarctica lying between Cape Williams and Cape Adare.

References

Cliffs of Victoria Land
Pennell Coast